Mark Edwin Robinson (born November 6, 1980) is an American film director and screenwriter.

Career
He made his directorial debut at the age of 22 with the horror film, Breaking Dawn (Lionsgate 2004) which was showcased at the Cannes Film Festival Marché du Film and at The Hollywood Film Festival. Robinson's follow up project is the mystery-horror, The Levenger Tapes to be released by Lionsgate Films in 2016. In January he began filming his latest project, the supernatural romance horror,  Into the Dark, with Mischa Barton and Ryan Eggold in the lead roles.

In 2001, with his father, David C. Robinson, he co-founded Castlight Pictures, Inc, a film, television and commercial production company based in Los Angeles and Temecula. He graduated from Linfield Christian School and began writing scripts when he was 16.

Filmography
Breaking Dawn (Lionsgate 2004)
The Levenger Tapes (Lionsgate 2016)
Into the Dark (Epic Pictures 2013)

References

External links
 

1980 births
Living people
American male screenwriters
Writers from San Diego
People from Temecula, California
Film directors from California
Screenwriters from California